Jewish conservatism is political and social conservatism rooted in or inspired by Judaism and specifically Jewish concerns.

In a 2015 essay for Mosaic, Eric Cohen identified three planks of Jewish conservatism: Jewish ideas about traditional family, hawkish foreign policy, and economic liberalism.

Neoconservatism is an American political movement that formed in opposition to the New Left. Many American Jewish conservatives either identify personally or have been categorized as Neoconservative; though the term in general post-Bush Administration has taken on a negative connotation (Neocon or Neo-Con is usually derogatory) and will nowadays find few American conservatives actually espousing to be Neoconservative. Many Neoconservatives were Jews disillusioned by leftist anti-Zionism.

Some Jewish conservatives in the west, especially those in the United States, ally themselves with conservative Christians under the pretense of shared Judeo-Christian values.

Prominent Jewish conservatives in the United States include Ben Shapiro and Dennis Prager.

See Also 

 Judaism and politics
 American Jews in politics

References

Social conservatism
Judaism and politics